Haydar Zorlu (born 4 May 1967 in Karlıova) is a Kurdish-German actor.

Filmography

Films 
1988 Eine türkische Hochzeit
1996 Der Trainer
2001 Nothing Less Than the Best
2003 September
2003 Worst Case
2008 Halbzeit
2008 Belanglos

TV 
1991-92 Türkei - Land, Leute und Sprache
1993 Sterne des Südens
1993 Tatort
1994 Die Sendung mit der Maus
1997 Ein todsicheres Ding
1998 Tatort
1998 Reise in die Nacht
1998-2008 Die Anrheiner
1999 Ein starkes Team
2003 Die Kumpel
2002 Westentaschenvenus
2003 
2003 SOKO 5113
2004 Forsthaus Falkenau
2004-2005 Verschollen
2005 Küstenwache
2006 Esir Kalpler
2006 Ein Fall für zwei
2006 Verschleppt - Kein Weg zurück, Regie: Hansjörg Thurn
2006-2008 Oben Ohne
2009 Oben Ohne - Weihnachts Special "DU HEILIGE NACHT"

Theatre 
1989 Moritz Jäger in "Die Weber" - Stadttheater Oberhausen
1989 -1991 Ensemblemitglied des Arkadas Theater`s Köln
1995 Agathe, Schlucki, Dieter, Leichi, Kontrolleur u.a. in "Linie 1" - Theater in der Christallerie Wadgassen
1996 Haroon in "Borderline" - Wupper Theater
1996 Naim in "Vermummte" - Wupper Theater / Freies Werkstatt-Theater Köln
2005 Entertainer, Thorndyke, Bürgermeister u.a. in "Die Marx Brothers Radio Show" - Arkadas Theater Köln
2009 Faust, Mephisto, Gretchen u.a. in "Goethes Faust" als Schauspielsolo - Bühne der Kulturen Köln

References

External links

Official Website

1967 births
Living people
People from Karlıova
German people of Turkish descent
German male film actors
German male stage actors
German male television actors
Turkish male film actors
Turkish male stage actors
Turkish male television actors